Liiva is a village on the Estonian island Muhu. It is the administrative centre of Muhu Parish in Saare County and also is the largest village in the municipality with a population of 189 (as of 1 January 2012). Liiva is situated in the heart of the island by the main road (segment of the Risti–Kuressaare road, nr 10).

Liiva is the location of the Early Gothic Muhu St. Catherine's Church from the 13th century.

Not far from the church there is a rectory from 1832, where a famous physiologist, founder of the coagulation theory Alexander Schmidt was born.

Liiva is home to the Muhu Primary School with about 100 pupils. There's also a library, supermarket (Konsum), post office and a pharmacy in the village.

Gallery

References

External links
Muhu Parish
Muhu St. Catherine's Congregation
Muhu Primary School 

Villages in Saare County
Populated coastal places in Estonia